The first season of the American reality television series American Ninja Warrior premiered on December 12, 2009 with the first four episodes of the season. The final four episodes were released on December 19, 2009. The season was hosted by Blair Herter and Alison Haislip and the finalists were sent to Japan to compete in Sasuke 23. All eight aired on G4, an American television network. Levi Meeuwenberg was the "Last Ninja Standing," meaning he made it the furthest of any American competitor on Sasuke 23. The season operated on a lower budget than any other season, and only two contestants who competed in the first season also competed in all thirteen other seasons—Brian Kretsch, and David Campbell.

Obstacles

Results

Qualifiers
The top thirty competitors moved on.

Semifinals
The top 15 finalists move onto the finals.

Finals
In the finals, competitors must face two challenges. The two times on each challenge combined are a given contestant's total time. The ten contestants with the top times go on to compete in Sasuke 23.

Challenge #1: Competitors must shove 10 large slabs across a 50-foot distance and arrange them in a pyramidical structure all while a bungee cord is strapped to them with a big tire on the end of the cord.

Challenge #2: In the first of three parts in this challenge competitors must crawl under a cargo net. Then, they must walk across two logs with a heavy barrel lifted high over their head. Finally, they must run through a forest of tires without touching the tires.

Mount Midoriyama

Stage 1

Stage 2

Stage 3

Episode Air Dates

References

External links

American Ninja Warrior
2009 American television seasons